State Trunk Highway 23 (often called Highway 23, STH-23 or WIS 23) is a state highway in the U.S. state of Wisconsin. The route is signed as a north–south route from Shullsburg to Wisconsin Dells and as an east–west route from Wisconsin Dells to Sheboygan. With the exception of freeway segments between Sheboygan Falls and Sheboygan, an expressway segment between Sheboygan Falls past Greenbush to Fond du Lac, a freeway concurrency with Interstate 39 (I-39), and an expressway segment concurrent with U.S. Highway 151 (US 151), the highway is generally either two-lane surface road or urban multilane arterial. WIS 23 provides access to several important Wisconsin destinations, such as the House on the Rock, the Wisconsin Dells area and various state parks.

Route description

Shullsburg to Wisconsin Dells 
WIS 23 shares  of road with WIS 81 starting at Avon, just south of the city, and ending in Darlington. From the county line, WIS 23 turns northwestward to Mineral Point. WIS 39 joins the route one mile (1.6 km) southeast of the city, and turns west off in the downtown area. WIS 23 turns northeast and joins US 151 for a four-mile (6 km) expressway concurrency. WIS 23 turns off US 151 at a trumpet interchange and passes through downtown Dodgeville. The highway junctions with WIS 191 in the city and crosses US 18 on the north side. Access to Governor Dodge State Park is provided off WIS 23. The highway passes the House on the Rock nine miles (14 km) north of Dodgeville. WIS 23 passes Tower Hill State Park at the Sauk County line.

WIS 23 passes through Spring Green upon entering Sauk County and crosses US 14 just north of the village. The highway passes through Plain about six miles (10 km) north of US 14 and Loganville another eleven miles (18 km) further north. WIS 154 joins the route in Loganville. then turns off the route to the east three miles (5 km) further north.

Wisconsin Dells to Sheboygan 
After another four miles (6 km), WIS 23 joins WIS 33 and becomes an east–west route in Reedsburg and follows the route east for six miles (10 km), before turning off northeast and stair-stepping in that direction toward Lake Delton. The highway passes through Mirror Lake State Park just prior to entering the village via Monroe Avenue. WIS 23 joins US 12 west and both routes turn north into the heart of the Wisconsin Dells tourism district along Wisconsin Dells Parkway north – passing attractions such as Noah's Ark Waterpark the Wisconsin Ducks boat tours, and Tommy Bartlett's Thrill Show WIS 23 turns at the junction with WIS 13 and WIS 16 with both routes following it eastbound along Broadway Street through downtown Wisconsin Dells and into Columbia County

WIS 13 turns north and WIS 16 turns south just east of the city and WIS 23 turns north into Adams County two miles (3 km) east of Wisconsin Dells. The highway then turns east, passing near Big Spring on the way into Marquette County after a six-mile (10 km) journey through Adams County. WIS 23 stairsteps northeast to Endeavor where it joins I-39/US 51 for six miles (10 km) before turning east off the interstate five miles (8 km) east of Oxford. WIS 23 passes through Montello and has a brief cosign with WIS 22 before turning northeast and entering Green Lake County six miles (10 km) northeast of Montello.

WIS 23 joins WIS 73 on the west side of Princeton. They head east along Main Street then south along Fulton Street before leaving the city. They continue to be cosigned heading east for another 3 miles before WIS 73 turns south to head to Randolph and Columbus. WIS 23 passes north of Green Lake and is joined by WIS 49 northeast of the city. A business route of WIS 23 exists, using Lawson Dr in Green Lake. The highway concurrency of 23 and 49 enters Fond du Lac County two miles (3 km) east of Green Lake. 23 and 49 continue heading southeast to Ripon. On the southeast side of Ripon, WIS 49 South, along with WIS 44 South, cuts south toward Brandon, Markesan and Waupun. WIS 44 has a short cosign with WIS 23 on the eastside of Ripon before it cuts north to Pickett and Oshkosh. WIS 23 continues east, crossing WIS 26 in Rosendale. As the highway enters Fond du Lac, it junctions with I-41 and becomes Johnson St., the main east–west thoroughfare through the city. WIS 23 crosses US 45 in the city center and US 151 on the east side. After a twelve-mile (19 km) rural stretch from Fond du Lac, WIS 23 enters Sheboygan County The route passes near Greenbush about four miles (6 km) into the county, then becomes a freeway about two miles (3 km) northwest of Plymouth, without exit numbering. Around Plymouth, access is provided to County Trunk Highway C (CTH-C), WIS 67, CTH-E, and WIS 57. In Sheboygan Falls, an interchange is present at WIS 32. WIS 23 junctions with I-43 at a cloverleaf interchange just west of Sheboygan. The freeway segment ends a mile east of Interstate 43 at North 25th Street, with an exit at Taylor Drive. WIS 23 follows Kohler Memorial Drive and the straight-line portion of Erie Ave into the city, continuing as a divided highway until three blocks before its termination at WIS 28 south and WIS 42 north. Erie Avenue continues undesignated for about .9 of a mile east, until coming to an end at a cul-de-sac a block west of Lake Michigan, overlooking Broughton Drive.

History 
The original 1918 routing of WIS 23 ended the route on the western terminus at Packwaukee at its junction with WIS 10. The route to the east of that point still exists as it is today. The route was extended in the early 1920s to the southwest, following its present routing from Packwaukee through Kilbourn (present day Wisconsin Dells), Reedsburg and Dodgeville, then along present day US 151 from Dodgeville to Dubuque, Iowa via Mineral Point and Platteville. Later in that decade, the route was truncated back to Dodgeville when US 118 was signed, but then extended again—this time along its current route when US 118 became part of US 151.

WIS 23 was relocated in the Sheboygan area to bypass Plymouth and Sheboygan Falls. Plans for this existed as early as 1972. Grading for the old alignment is still visible to the southwest of the current WIS 23/I-43 interchange, and the rest of the old alignment is still in use today as Greenfield Drive.

Proposals were considered that would have rerouted WIS 23 around Lake Delton by following CTH-H from Reedsburg directly to Wisconsin Dells, but the village of Lake Delton did not support the plan due to pressure from local businesses.

The Wisconsin Department of Transportation (WisDOT) had made WIS 23 between Fond du Lac and Sheboygan a priority state corridor in its highway planning, studying the expansion of WIS 23 from Fond du Lac to Plymouth to a four-lane expressway, as the rural two-lane portion between Mount Calvary and Greenbush towards the county line, along with the two-lane narrowing just outside of Fond du Lac, has been the site of a number of various accidents with casualties. A draft environmental impact statement was presented in 2004 and the bypass route following the existing alignment was chosen in 2005. Construction of the expansion was scheduled to begin in 2015, but was delayed by a lawsuit by an environmental group which prevented delegation of federal funds until resolved, along with overall political issues involving the state transportation budget. A new environmental study was compiled, filed and approved in October 2018. Construction began on the conversion and expansion in May 2019, and was concluded in the fall of 2022.

Major intersections

Business routes

Green Lake 

Business State Trunk Highway 23 (Bus. WIS 23) in Green Lake follows the former alignment of WIS 23, after the highway was realigned in 1967.

Plymouth 

Business State Trunk Highway 23 (Bus. WIS 23) in Plymouth follows the former alignment of WIS 23, after the highway was realigned in 1985.

See also

References

External links

023
Transportation in Lafayette County, Wisconsin
Transportation in Iowa County, Wisconsin
Transportation in Sauk County, Wisconsin
Transportation in Columbia County, Wisconsin
Transportation in Adams County, Wisconsin
Transportation in Marquette County, Wisconsin
Transportation in Green Lake County, Wisconsin
Transportation in Fond du Lac County, Wisconsin
Transportation in Sheboygan County, Wisconsin